Ben Nguyen or Nguyễn Ben, (born August 3, 1988) is an American mixed martial artist who competed as a flyweight in the Ultimate Fighting Championship (UFC), where he compiled a record of 4–3 with the organization. He is also a former Nitro Bantamweight Champion and K-Oz Bantamweight Champion.

MMA career

Early career
Nguyen began his professional mixed martial arts career while working during the day as a computer technician. In 2012 he went to Thailand to attend Tiger Muay Thai & MMA Scholar Athlete program. He then moved to Brisbane, Australia fighting from there.

Nguyen made his professional MMA debut in December 2006, losing his first fight. Over the next nearly eight years, he amassed a record of 14 wins against 5 losses and in the process became the Nitro Bantamweight Champion, K-Oz Bantamweight Champion and the number one Bantamweight in Australia in 2015.

Nguyen achieved internet fame when his March 8, 2014 fight versus Julian Wallace surfaced on YouTube. Wallace attempted to intimidate Nguyen at the pre-fight weigh-ins by forcefully putting his fist against Nguyen's chin and trying to put Nguyen off his game. This tactic, however, proved ineffective as Nguyen knocked Wallace out within 25 seconds of the first round. The video of this fight went viral and has amassed over 58 million views on YouTube, and over a 100 million views on Facebook and other social network platforms.

Ultimate Fighting Championship
Nguyen made his promotional debut, facing Alptekin Özkılıç on May 10, 2015, at UFC Fight Night 65. He won the fight via KO in the first round.

Nguyen faced Ryan Benoit on November 15, 2015, at UFC 193. He won the fight via submission in the first round.

Nguyen was expected to face Justin Scoggins on March 20, 2016, at UFC Fight Night 85. However, Scoggins pulled out of the fight in the week leading up to the event citing injury. As a result, Nguyen was pulled from the card entirely.

Nguyen next faced Louis Smolka on July 13, 2016, at UFC Fight Night 91. He lost the fight via TKO in the second round.

Nguyen faced Geane Herrera on November 27, 2016, at UFC Fight Night 101. He won the fight via unanimous decision.

Nguyen was expected to face Joseph Benavidez on June 11, 2017, at UFC Fight Night 110. However, Benavidez pulled out of the fight on May 10 with a knee injury and was replaced by Tim Elliott. He won the fight by submission due to a rear-naked choke in the first round. The win also earned him his first Performance of the Night bonus award.

Nguyen faced Jussier Formiga on February 11, 2018, at UFC 221. He lost the fight via technical submission in the third round due to a rear-naked choke.

Nguyen faced Wilson Reis on December 2, 2018, at UFC Fight Night 142. He lost the fight via unanimous decision and was subsequently released from the promotion.

Rizin Fighting Federation
On January 31, 2019 Rizin Fighting Federation announced Nguyen had signed for the promotion. He faced Kyoji Horiguchi in a 132-pound catchweight bout on April 21, 2019, at Rizin 15. Nguyen lost the fight via TKO in the first round.

Personal life
Nguyen's hometown is Sioux Falls, South Dakota. Nguyen said that he started Taekwondo when he was twelve years old after he was bullied in school by both White American and Black American students.<ref>Nguyen talks about himself in a video that was published to YouTube on April 3, 2013. From the 6:43 mark of the video to the 6:52 mark of the video, Nguyen said, "'Taekwondo, I started when I was twelve, after uh I got bullied in school. My mom threw me into martial arts."</ref> After high school, he went to college to become an engineer but then he switched paths to follow his dream of becoming an MMA fighter.

Nguyen met his wife, Brisbane kickboxer April Adams, while training in Thailand, eventually following her to make Brisbane his home. They married in late 2015. In a 2015 video, Nguyen said that he owns two cats which were both about a year old. Nguyen said that he likes cars and motorcycles.

Ben is a fan of the anime Hajime no Ippo. He's said that the show had been an inspiration to him as long as he's been fighting. He uses "Inner Light," one of the anime's opening songs, as his intro song for his fights.

Championships and accomplishmentsUltimate Fighting ChampionshipPerformance of the Night (One time) vs. Tim ElliottNitro MMA'''
Nitro MMA Bantamweight Champion (One Time)
One successful title defense

Mixed martial arts record

|-
|Loss
|align=center|18–9
|Kyoji Horiguchi
|KO (punches) 
|Rizin 15
|
|align=center|1
|align=center|2:53
|Yokohama, Japan
|
|-
|Loss
|align=center|18–8
|Wilson Reis
|Decision (unanimous)
|UFC Fight Night: dos Santos vs. Tuivasa 
|
|align=center|3
|align=center|5:00
|Adelaide, Australia
|
|-
|Loss
|align=center|18–7
|Jussier Formiga
|Technical Submission (rear-naked choke)
|UFC 221 
|
|align=center|3
|align=center|1:43
|Perth, Australia
|
|-
|Win
|align=center|18–6
|Tim Elliott
|Submission (rear-naked choke)
|UFC Fight Night: Lewis vs. Hunt
|
|align=center|1
|align=center|0:49
|Auckland, New Zealand
|
|-
|Win
|align=center|17–6
|Geane Herrera
|Decision (unanimous)
|UFC Fight Night: Whittaker vs. Brunson
|
|align=center|3
|align=center|5:00
|Melbourne, Australia
|  
|-
|Loss
|align=center|16–6
|Louis Smolka
|TKO (punches and elbows)
|UFC Fight Night: McDonald vs. Lineker
|
|align=center|2
|align=center|4:41
|Sioux Falls, South Dakota, United States
|  
|-
|Win
|align=center|16–5
|Ryan Benoit
|Submission (rear-naked choke)
|UFC 193
|
|align=center|1
|align=center|2:35
|Melbourne, Australia
|
|-
|Win
|align=center|15–5
|Alp Ozkilic
|TKO (punches)
|UFC Fight Night: Miocic vs. Hunt
|
|align=center|1
|align=center|4:59
|Adelaide, Australia
|
|-
|Win
|align=center|14–5
|Reece McLaren
|Decision (unanimous)
|Nitro MMA 12
|
|align=center|5
|align=center|5:00
|Logan City, Australia
|
|-
|Win
|align=center|13–5
|Julian Wallace
|KO (punch)
|Nitro MMA 11
|
|align=center|1
|align=center|0:25
|Logan City, Australia
|
|-
|Win
|align=center|12–5
|Shantaram Maharaj
|Submission (rear-naked choke)
|K-Oz Entertainment – Bragging Rights 6: Night of Titles
|
|align=center|3
|align=center|3:58
|Madeley, Australia
|
|-
|Win
|align=center|11–5
|Luke Morris
|Decision (unanimous)
|K.O. Martial Arts: Adrenalin-Unleashed
|
|align=center|3
|align=center|5:00
|Eatons Hill, Australia
|
|-
|Win
|align=center|10–5
|Kian Pham
|TKO (punches)
|Australia Regional 
|
|align=center|2
|align=center|2:48
|Brisbane, Australia
|
|-
|Win
|align=center|9–5
|Greg Penaloza
|TKO (doctor stoppage)
|Roshambo MMA 1: In the Cage
|
|align=center|2
|align=center|5:00
|Brisbane, Australia
|
|-
|Win
|align=center|8–5
|Andrew Whitney
|Submission (armbar)
|The Cage Inc.: Battle at the Border 9
|
|align=center|1
|align=center|3:48
|Hankinson, North Dakota, United States
|
|-
|Loss
|align=center|7–5
|Chavalit Sityodtong
|TKO (punches)
|Martial Combat 7
|
|align=center|2
|align=center|N/A
|Sentosa, Singapore
|
|-
|Win
|align=center|7–4
|Laramie Shaffer
|TKO (doctor stoppage)
|OFC: Battle at Huset's Speedway
|
|align=center|1
|align=center|5:00
|Brandon, South Dakota, United States
|
|-
|Loss
|align=center|6–4
|Josh Phillips
|TKO (punches)
|The Cage Inc.: Battle at the Border 5
|
|align=center|4
|align=center|3:51
|Hankinson, North Dakota, United States
|
|-
|Loss
|align=center|6–3
|Eric Perez
|TKO (punches)
|Canadian Fighting Championship 3
|
|align=center|2
|align=center|4:20
|Winnipeg, Manitoba, Canada
|
|-
|Loss
|align=center|6–2
|Alexis Vila
|KO (punch)
| PFC: Best of Both Worlds
|
|align=center|2
|align=center|0:34
|Lemoore, California, United States
|
|-
|Win
|align=center|6–1
|Danny Schroder
|TKO (corner stoppage)
|TCI: Fight Hunger
|
|align=center|2
|align=center|2:07
|Sioux Falls, South Dakota, United States
|
|-
|Win
|align=center|5–1
|Nate Hansen
|Submission (triangle choke)
|The Cage Inc.: Summer Slam 4
|
|align=center|1
|align=center|1:30
|Sioux Falls, South Dakota, United States
|
|-
|Win
|align=center|4–1
|Nick Holbrook
|KO (punches)
|Fury Fights: Battle in Brookings 3
|
|align=center|2
|align=center|2:36
|Brookings, South Dakota, United States
|
|-
|Win
|align=center|3–1
|Mitch Wisner
|TKO (punches)
|Fury Fights: Temple Fight Night 2
|
|align=center|1
|align=center|2:00
|Brookings, South Dakota, United States
|
|-
|Win
|align=center|2–1
|Chuck Page
|KO (elbows)
|Fury Fights: Temple Fight Night 1
|
|align=center|1
|align=center|3:12
|Brookings, South Dakota, United States
|
|-
|Win
|align=center|1–1
|Jess Fuhriman
|KO (punches)
|Fury Fights: Battle in Brookings 2
|
|align=center|1
|align=center|0:34
|Brookings, South Dakota, United States
|
|-
|Loss
|align=center|0–1
|Austin Peterson
|Submission (rear-naked choke)
|Fury Fights: Battle in Brookings 1
|
|align=center|2
|align=center|0:58
|Brookings, South Dakota, United States
|
|-

References

External links
 
 

Living people
1988 births
American male mixed martial artists
Flyweight mixed martial artists
American practitioners of Brazilian jiu-jitsu
People awarded a black belt in Brazilian jiu-jitsu
American Muay Thai practitioners
American people of Vietnamese descent
American male taekwondo practitioners
Mixed martial artists from South Dakota
Mixed martial artists utilizing Muay Thai
Mixed martial artists utilizing taekwondo
Mixed martial artists utilizing judo
Mixed martial artists utilizing Brazilian jiu-jitsu
Sportspeople from Sioux Falls, South Dakota
American expatriate sportspeople in Australia
American male kickboxers
American male judoka
American emigrants to Australia
Sportspeople of Vietnamese descent
Ultimate Fighting Championship male fighters